James Building, also known as Summerton Hardware and Summerton Hardware Company, is a historic commercial building located at Summerton, Clarendon County, South Carolina. It was built in 1905, and is a two-story brick building with a cast-iron storefront. The building has two storefronts and interior spaces with single-story sections to the rear. The building housed the telephone exchange and a hardware store and would have been a central focus of the town in the early-20th century.

It was listed in the National Register of Historic Places in 2007.

References

Commercial buildings on the National Register of Historic Places in South Carolina
Commercial buildings completed in 1905
Buildings and structures in Clarendon County, South Carolina
National Register of Historic Places in Clarendon County, South Carolina
1905 establishments in South Carolina